Security Device Event Exchange (SDEE) is a new standard proposed by the International Computer Security Association that specifies the format of messages and protocol used to communicate events generated by security devices.

This protocol is used in the Cisco Systems IPS Sensor 5.0 to replace Remote Data Exchange Protocol (RDEP), which is used by earlier versions of the Cisco IDS Sensor.

External links
ICSA Labs IDS Consortium Announces Network Intrusion Detection System Alert Specification Format 23 February 2004, BUSINESS WIRE 
ICSA Labs Announces Security Device Event Exchange (SDEE) 13 March 2004, Richard Bejtlich
Cisco Intrusion Detection Event Exchange (CIDEE) specifies the extensions to the Security Device Event Exchange (SDEE)

Intrusion detection systems